Birds described in 1865 include volcano hummingbird, white-fronted tit, Monteiro's hornbill, biscutate swift, bare-cheeked babbler, rufous-throated flycatcher, chestnut-rumped thornbill
Osbert Salvin Descriptions of Seventeen New Species of Birds from Costa Rica.Proceedings of the Zoological Society of London 1864  
Death of German explorer Karl Klaus von der Decken.
Death of Thomas Bellerby Wilson
Death of Alfred Malherbe
1865 heralds rapid expansion of the collections of Cambridge University Museum of Zoology.
Description of the fossil swan Cygnus falconeri.

Expeditions
1865–1868 Magenta circumnavigation of the globe  Italian expedition that made important scientific observations in South America.
1865– HMS Curacoa
Alfred Grandidier makes his first visit to Madagascar.

Ongoing events
John Gould The birds of Australia Supplement 1851–69. 1 vol. 81 plates; Artists: J. Gould and H. C. Richter; Lithographer: H. C. Richter
John Gould The birds of Asia 1850-83 7 vols. 530 plates, Artists: J. Gould, H. C. Richter, W. Hart and J. Wolf; Lithographers:H. C. Richter and W. Hart
The Ibis

References

Bird
Birding and ornithology by year